The 1948 football season was São Paulo's 19th season since the club's founding in 1930.

Overall

{|class="wikitable"
|-
|Games played || 45 (20 Campeonato Paulista, 25 Friendly match)
|-
|Games won ||  29 (16 Campeonato Paulista, 13 Friendly match)
|-
|Games drawn || 6 (2 Campeonato Paulista, 4 Friendly match)
|-
|Games lost || 10 (2 Campeonato Paulista, 8 Friendly match)
|-
|Goals scored || 103
|-
|Goals conceded || 52
|-
|Goal difference || +51
|-
|Best result || 8–0 (H) v Juventus – Campeonato Paulista – 1948.11.13
|-
|Worst result || 0–3 (A) v Atlético Mineiro – Friendly match – 1948.05.27
|-
|Most appearances || 
|-
|Top scorer || 
|-

Friendlies

Official competitions

Campeonato Paulista

Record

External links
official website 

Association football clubs 1948 season
1948
1948 in Brazilian football